The International Association of Schools of Social Work (IASSW) is the worldwide association of schools of social work, as well as social work educators. The IASSW was founded in 1928.

Structure and leadership 

The organization is governed by the Board of Directors, made up of both elected and appointed members. The IASSW had 13 Presidents.

A list of IASSW Presidents: 
 1928/29-1946	Alice Salomon (Germany, than – USA)
 1946–1953	René Sand (Belgium)
 1954–1961	Jan Floris de Jongh (Netherlands)
 1961–1968	Eileena Younghusband (United Kingdom)
 1968–1976	Herman D. Stein (USA)
 1976–1980	Robin Huws Jones (United Kingdom)
 1980–1988	Heiner Schiller (Germany)
 1988–1996	Ralph Garber (Canada)
 1996–2004	Lena Dominelli (United Kingdom)
 2004–2008	Abye Tasse (Ethiopia) 
 2008–2012	Angelina Yuen (Hong Kong)
 2012–2016	Vimla Nadkarni (India)
 2016–Present	Annamaria Campanini (Italy)
IASSW implements its major activities through a committee and task force structure. Committees include the nomination and election; capacity building; human rights and social justice; communication and publication;  sustainability, climate change, disaster intervention; IASSW- at United Nations, New York; language; international projects; research; finance; membership and women interest group. Task forces include the Global Agenda and the Global Standards for Education and Training.

Activities 
Major Activities of IASSW include:

 IASSW Global Standards Task Force
 IASSW launched a “Task Force” to implement the Global Standards for Social Work Education and Training. IASSW looks forward to working with schools of social work across the globe to implement these standards to achieve excellence in social work education.
 Monthly Webinars
 IASSW conducts monthly webinars on social work issues. Themes are selected based on UN themes for the month E.g. Social Justice, Peacekeeping, Mental Health, etc.
 IASSW Monthly & Weekly newsletters
 Newsletters inform our members of social work education's latest happenings globally. They serve as a platform for members to advertise their upcoming social work conferences/seminars or other events.
 Capacity Building Workshops
 IASSW through its Capacity Building Committee collaborates with regional, subregional, and national entities in the development of workshops and conferences that are relevant to the region.
 Cross-sectoral learning
 IASSW partners with organizations to provide cross-sectoral learning experience for members
 International Projects Grant Funding
 IASSW members are eligible for international projects grant funding collaborating with three countries. 
 Global Social Work Documents- I
 ASSW with IFSW, developed three Global Social Work Documents, available on the IASSW website including the Global definition of Social Work; Ethics in Social Work, Statement of principle; Global Standards for Social Work Education and Training.
 Global Definition Of Social Work was approved by the IASSW General Assembly and IFSW General Meeting in July 2014.
 Ethics In Social Work, Statement Of Principles - IASSW version of the Global Social Work Statement of Ethical Principles which was unanimously adopted at the General Assembly of IASSW on 5th July 2018 in Dublin, Ireland is available in various languages.
 The International Association of Schools of Social Work (IASSW) and the International Federation of Social Workers (IFSW) have approved in July 2020  Global Standards for Social Work Education and Training.
 IASSW with ICSW and IFSW, developed the Global Agenda 2010–2020 and is developing the Global Agenda 2020–2030. Annually IASSW in collaboration with ICSW and IFSW sponsors World Social Work Day at UN. The theme for World Social Work Day is based on the pillars of the Global Agenda.

See also
 Social work
 :Category:Social work education

References

External links
 International Association of Schools of Social Work
 Council of Social Work Education (CSWE) https://www.cswe.org
 International Council of Social Welfare (ICSW) https://www.icsw.org/
 International Federation of Social Workers(IFSW)
 Australian Association of Social Workers (Australia)
 Professional Social Workers' Association (India)
 British Association of Social Workers (U.K.)
 National Association of Social Workers (U.S.)
  Hellenic Association of Social Workers (Greece)

Social work education
Social work organizations